Turbo militaris, common name the military turban, is a species of sea snail, marine gastropod mollusk in the family Turbinidae.

This species is also often confused with Turbo imperialis.

Description
The length of the shell varies between 60 mm and 100 mm. The large, solid shell has rounded whorls. It is variable in its external morphology, due to the presence or absence of spines. There are both smooth (except for growth striae close the lips) and spiny forms (with two rows of open-fronted spines on the body whorl). There are also forms with a morphology between these two extremes. They also differ in the presence of the anterior canal, which is almost non-existent in the smooth forms, but prominent in the spiny forms. These two forms can be found together on the same site. The aperture is subcircular and pearly white within. The simple outer lip is rather thin. The color pattern of the shell is formed by spiral bands of brown or green over a fawn background. The columella is smooth with a white callus with green edges. The subcircular operculum is calcareous. Its outer surface is white with a slight amount of green.

Distribution
This marine species occurs off Australia from North Queensland to New South Wales, Australia

References

 Gmelin J.F. 1791. Caroli a Linné. Systema Naturae per regna tria naturae, secundum classes, ordines, genera, species, cum characteribus, differentiis, synonymis, locis. Lipsiae : Georg. Emanuel. Beer Vermes. Vol. 1(Part 6) pp. 3021–3910
 Reeve, L.A. 1848. Monograph of the genus Turbo. pls 1–13 in Reeve, L.A. (ed). Conchologia Iconica. London : L. Reeve & Co. Vol. 4.
 Allan, J.K. 1950. Australian Shells: with related animals living in the sea, in freshwater and on the land. Melbourne : Georgian House xix, 470 pp., 45 pls, 112 text figs.
 Iredale, T. & McMichael, D.F. 1962. A reference list of the marine Mollusca of New South Wales. Memoirs of the Australian Museum 11: 1–109 
 Cernohorsky, W.O. 1974. Type specimens of Mollusca in the University Zoological Museum Copenhagen. Records of the Auckland Institute and Museum 11: 143–195
 Cernohorsky, W.O. 1978. Tropical Pacific marine shells. Sydney : Pacific Publications 352 pp., 68 pls
 Wilson, B. 1993. Australian Marine Shells. Prosobranch Gastropods. Kallaroo, Western Australia : Odyssey Publishing Vol. 1 408 pp. 
 Alf, A. & Kreipl, K. 2003. A Conchological Iconography: The Family Turbinidae, Subfamily Turbininae, Genus Turbo. Hackenheim, Germany : ConchBooks 68 pp., 95 colour plates.
 Williams, S.T. (2007). Origins and diversification of Indo-West Pacific marine fauna: evolutionary history and biogeography of turban shells (Gastropoda, Turbinidae). Biological Journal of the Linnean Society, 2007, 92, 573–592.
 Alf A. & Kreipl K. (2011) The family Turbinidae. Subfamily Turbinidae, Genus Turbo. Errata, corrections and new information on the genera Lunella, Modelia and Turbo (vol. I). In: G.T. Poppe & K. Groh (eds), A Conchological Iconography. Hackenheim: Conchbooks. pp. 69–72, pls 96–103

External links
 
 Seashells of New South Wales: Turbo (Dinassovica) militaris
  Steven Smith, Margie Möhring, Adam Davey: Variation in the external morphology of Turbo militaris, Reeve, 1848

militaris
Gastropods of Australia
Gastropods described in 1848